Jaime Fernández Saracho (born 28 February 1957) is a Mexican teacher and politician affiliated with the Institutional Revolutionary Party. As of 2014 he served as Deputy of the LIX Legislature of the Mexican Congress representing Durango.

References

1957 births
Living people
Politicians from Durango
Institutional Revolutionary Party politicians
Members of the Congress of Durango
20th-century Mexican politicians
21st-century Mexican politicians
Deputies of the LIX Legislature of Mexico
Members of the Chamber of Deputies (Mexico) for Durango